Isaac Lowe (born 21 January 1994) is a British professional boxer. He has held the WBC International featherweight title since 2018. Previously, he held the Commonwealth featherweight title in 2016, and challenged for the European and British featherweight titles in 2017 and 2018 respectively, drawing both contests.

Early life

Lowe was born in Lancashire and resides in Morecambe, Lancashire. Lowe turned professional at the age of 18. He is a friend and training partner of heavyweight world champion Tyson Fury.

References

External links
 

1989 births
Living people
English male boxers
Featherweight boxers